Iosif Mihalic (13 November 1938 – 2004) was a Romanian boxer. He competed at the 1960 Summer Olympics and the 1964 Summer Olympics.

References

External links

1938 births
2004 deaths
Romanian male boxers
Olympic boxers of Romania
Boxers at the 1960 Summer Olympics
Boxers at the 1964 Summer Olympics
Sportspeople from Cluj-Napoca
Light-welterweight boxers